In investing, a developed market is a country that is most developed in terms of its economy and capital markets. The country must be high income, but this also includes openness to foreign ownership, ease of capital movement, and efficiency of market institutions. This term is contrasted with developing market (emerging markets and frontier markets are types of developing markets).

FTSE Group list
FTSE Group, a provider of economic and financial data, assigns the market status of countries as Developed, Advanced Emerging, Secondary Emerging or Frontier on the basis of their economic size, wealth, quality of markets, depth of markets, breadth of markets.
From 26 September 2019, FTSE Group classifies 26 countries as developed markets:

FTSE criteria
Developed countries all have met criteria under the following categories:
 They are high income economies (as measured by the World Bank GNI per capita Rating, Market and Regulatory Environment)
 Formal stock market regulatory authorities actively monitor market (e.g., SEC, FSA, SFC)
 Fair and non-prejudicial treatment of minority shareholders
 Non or selective incidence of foreign ownership restrictions
 No objections or significant restrictions or penalties applied on the repatriation of capital    
 Free and well-developed equity market  
 Free and well-developed foreign exchange market 
 Non or simple registration process for foreign investors 
 Custody and Settlement
 Settlement – Rare incidence of failed trades
 Custody-Sufficient competition to ensure high quality custodian services
 Clearing & settlement – T +3 or shorter, T+7 or shorter for Frontier
 Stock Lending is permitted 
 Settlement – Free delivery available 
 Custody – Omnibus account facilities available to international investors 
 Dealing Landscape
 Brokerage – Sufficient competition to ensure high quality broker services
 Liquidity – Sufficient broad market liquidity to support sizeable global investment 
 Transaction costs – implicit and explicit costs to be reasonable and competitive 
 Short sales permitted 
 Off-exchange transactions permitted 
 Efficient trading mechanism 
 Transparency – market depth information / visibility and timely trade reporting process
 Derivatives
 Developed derivatives markets
 Size of Market
 Market Capitalisation 
 Total Number of Listed Companies (as of 31 December 2008)

MSCI list
As of June 2019, MSCI classified the following 25 countries as developed markets:

According to MSCI Global investable Market Indexes Methodology – November 2019, Cyprus and Luxembourg "are part of the developed market universe", but "given their modest size, these markets are not included in the MSCI World index".

S&P list
As of 24 June 2019, Standard and Poor's classifies the following 25 countries as developed markets:

STOXX list
As of 23 September 2019, STOXX classifies the following 25 countries as developed markets:

Table

See also
 Developed country
 Emerging market
 First World
 Frontier markets
 Global North and Global South

References

Economic country classifications
International development
Investment